Rezső von Bartha (26 August 1912 – 24 July 2001) was a Hungarian épée fencer and modern pentathlete. He competed at the 1936 Summer Olympics.

References

External links
 

1912 births
2001 deaths
Hungarian male épée fencers
Hungarian male modern pentathletes
Olympic fencers of Hungary
Olympic modern pentathletes of Hungary
Fencers at the 1936 Summer Olympics
Modern pentathletes at the 1936 Summer Olympics
Fencers from Budapest